Ajit Singh Bhullar (born 5 November 1931) is an Indian former high jumper who competed in the 1956 Summer Olympics. He finished eleventh in the 1954 British Empire and Commonwealth Games high jump.

References

External links
 

1931 births
Possibly living people
Sportspeople from Patiala
Indian male high jumpers
Olympic athletes of India
Athletes (track and field) at the 1956 Summer Olympics
Asian Games gold medalists for India
Athletes (track and field) at the 1954 Asian Games
Commonwealth Games competitors for India
Athletes (track and field) at the 1954 British Empire and Commonwealth Games
Asian Games medalists in athletics (track and field)
Medalists at the 1954 Asian Games